H.C. Cradock born Augusta Whiteford in 1863 was an English children's book writer.

Biography
The daughter of a Church of England clergyman, she married Rev Henry Cowper Cradock, also a Church of England clergyman and took his initials as well as his surname as her pen name.  Their only child, Aline Mary, named after her mother-in-law Aline, was born in 1905.

Cradock died after suffering a stroke in Dorking on 15 October 1941.

Bibliography

Non fiction
 The Care of Babies, a Reading Book for Girls (1908)
 The Training of Children from Cradle to School, a Guide for Young Mothers, Teachers and Nurses (1909)

The Adventures of Josephine
 Josephine and Her Dolls (1915)
 Josephine Keeps School
 Josephine Keeps House
 Josephine's Pantomime
 Josephine's Christmas Party
 Josephine Goes Travelling
 Josephine, John, and the Puppy
 The Bonny Book of Josephine

Adventures of a Teddy Bear
 Adventures of a Teddy Bear (1934)
 More Adventures of a Teddy Bear 
 In Teddy Bear's House 
 Teddy Bear's Shop 
 Teddy Bear's Farm
 Pamela's Teddy Bears

Notes

External links
 http://www.bl.uk/reshelp/findhelpsubject/literature/chillit/craddock/cradock.html (Biography)
 http://explore.bl.uk/primo_library/libweb/action/search.do?dscnt=0&frbg=&scp.scps=scope%3A%28BLCONTENT%29&tab=local_tab&dstmp=1412497056543&srt=rank&ct=search&mode=Basic&vl%28488279563UI0%29=any&dum=true&tb=t&indx=1&vl%28freeText0%29=Cradock%20Mrs%20Henry%20Cowper.&vid=BLVU1&fn=search (Bibliography)

1863 births
1941 deaths
20th-century English novelists
20th-century English women writers
English children's writers
English women novelists
British women children's writers